Another Time, Another Place is a live album by saxophonist/composers Benny Carter and Phil Woods recorded in Cambridge in 1996 and released by the Evening Star label.

Reception

AllMusic reviewer Ken Dryden stated "Alto saxophonists Benny Carter and Phil Woods were great friends and enjoyed playing together on a number of record dates, though this double-CD live recording from a 1996 extended gig at the Regattabar proved to be the former's final release before he retired from active performing a few years afterward. A few months shy of 89 years old at the time, Carter still gives his all on his instrument and sounds like someone decades younger, while Woods' naturally more outgoing style proves complementary to the senior musician. ... Beautifully recorded, this final meeting between Benny Carter and Phil Woods is one for the ages".

Track listing
All compositions by Benny Carter except where noted

Disc One:
 "Sometimes I'm Happy" (Vincent Youmans, Irving Caesar) – 8:53	
 "Spring Will Be a Little Late This Year" (Frank Loesser) – 6:33
 "Rock Me to Sleep" – 8:33
 "Another Time, Another Place" – 8:29
 "Willow Weep for Me" (Ann Ronell) – 7:33
 "Shiny Stockings" (Frank Foster) – 10:01
 "The Courtship" – 10:36
 "On the Sunny Side of the Street" (Jimmy McHugh, Dorothy Fields) – 11:11
Disc Two:
 "On Green Dolphin Street" (Bronisław Kaper, Ned Washington) – 9:16
 "A Walkin' Thing" – 8:52
 "Janel" – 5:46
 "Speak Low" (Kurt Weill, Ogden Nash) – 8:50	
 "Petite Chanson" (Phil Woods) – 7:24
 "Just Squeeze Me" (Duke Ellington, Lee Gaines) – 9:05
 "Mood Indigo" (Ellington, Barney Bigard, Irving Mills) – 9:33
 "How High the Moon" (Morgan Lewis, Nancy Hamilton) – 6:12

Personnel 
Benny Carter – alto saxophone
Phil Woods – alto saxophone
Chris Neville – piano
John Lockwood – bass
Sherman Ferguson – drums

References 

1996 live albums
Benny Carter live albums
Phil Woods live albums